Ben Remocker (born 29 November 1978) is a Canadian sailor. He competed in the 49er event at the 2008 Summer Olympics.

References

External links
 

1978 births
Living people
Canadian male sailors (sport)
Olympic sailors of Canada
Sailors at the 2008 Summer Olympics – 49er
Sportspeople from Vancouver